Chambi is a small village in Himachal Pradesh. in India. The village is situated among the mountains. It does not have a post office or school and is very sparsely populated. It is just a small place situated opposite the town of Rait, with a few shops and a bus stop.

External links
 http://www.censusindia.gov.in/Population_Finder/Population_Finder.aspx?Name=chambia&Criteria=U

Villages in Mandi district